Skelly Alvero (born 2 May 2002) is a French professional footballer who plays as a midfielder for Sochaux in the French Ligue 2.

Professional career
A youth product of Red Star, Alvero moved to the Sochaux youth academy on 25 May 2017. He began his senior career with the Sochaux reserves in 2020. He debuted with the senior Sochaux squad as a late substitute in a 3–0 Coupe de France win over Bresse Jura Foot on 13 November 2021. He signed his first professional contract for 3 seasons on 18 February 2022.

Personal life
Born in France, Alvero is of Angolan descent.

References

External links
 

2002 births
Living people
Footballers from Seine-Saint-Denis
French footballers
French sportspeople of Angolan descent
Association football midfielders
Olympique Alès players
FC Sète 34 players
Grenoble Foot 38 players
Ligue 2 players
Championnat National players
Championnat National 3 players